Ryan Edward Upchurch (born May 24, 1991), known professionally as Upchurch, Ryan Upchurch and formerly known as Upchurch The Redneck, is an American rapper, singer, songwriter, and comedian from Cheatham County, Tennessee, on the outskirts of Nashville, Tennessee. Upchurch became popular primarily as a comedian, creating videos on various platforms to garner support and fans. He sold merchandise and coined the phrase “raise hell and eat cornbread." Originally considered a "country rapper," Ryan Upchurch has diversified into many genres including rap, rock, and country.

Music career
Upchurch began uploading videos to YouTube. He released an extended play, Cheatham County, in 2015, followed by a full-length album, Heart of America, in 2016. Both releases reached the top 30 of the Billboard Top Country Albums chart. Heart of America sold 1,300 copies in its first week of release.

The second full-length album, Chicken Willie, was released in August 2016.  It reached No. 22 on Billboard's Top Country Albums and No. 11 on the Rap Albums charts, selling 2,800 copies in the first week. In 2017 Upchurch released another EP titled Summer Love, which is completely country-oriented, with no elements of rap music; and another studio album titled Son of the South.  Summer Love  debuted at No. 33 in the Top Country Albums chart with  3,700 copies sold, while Son of the South debuted at No. 29 with 48,100 copies sold.

Upchurch's fifth studio album, King of Dixie, was released on November 10, 2017, and features 19 tracks. Upchurch's first rock album, Creeker, was released on April 20 which was focused on rock with few rap elements. His August 2018 release, Supernatural, a rap-focused album with some country elements, peaked at No. 6 on Billboard's Top Country Albums. His December 2018 album, River Rat, peaked at No. 22.

Upchurch released his next album, Creeker II in April 2019, featuring 10 songs such as Gassed Up, and Hillbilly Psycho.  Later in 2019 he released Parachute on September 24. Later in 2019 Upchurch released a collaboration album with Adam Calhoun  on November 25, 2019.

Discography

Albums

Extended plays

Charted songs

Music videos

References

External links

1991 births
Living people
21st-century American male singers
21st-century American rappers
American country singer-songwriters
American heavy metal musicians
American male rappers
American male singer-songwriters
Comedians from Tennessee
Country musicians from Tennessee
Country rap musicians
Country rock musicians
People from Cheatham County, Tennessee
Rap rock musicians
Singer-songwriters from Tennessee
Southern hip hop musicians
Southern rock musicians